Yannick van der Ark (born April 12, 1993) is a former professional basketball player. He played four seasons with the GasTerra Flames from Groningen. He won a Dutch Championship and two Cups with the team.

References

External links
DBL Profile

1993 births
Living people
Dutch men's basketball players
Dutch Basketball League players
Donar (basketball club) players
Shooting guards
Sportspeople from Groningen (city)